Lakeisha Pearson is a Guyanese footballer who plays as a midfielder for Fruta Conquerors FC and the Guyana women's national team.

Club career
Pearson has played for Fruta Conquerors in Guyana.

International career
Pearson capped for Guyana at senior level during the 2018 CFU Women's Challenge Series.

See also
List of Guyana women's international footballers

References

Living people
Guyanese women's footballers
Women's association football midfielders
Guyana women's international footballers
Year of birth missing (living people)